Dr. M A Wazed Miah Textile Engineering College is located in Rangpur District, Bangladesh, and is affiliated with the Bangladesh University of Textiles. In August 2018, the executive committee of the National Economic Council approved the establishment of the college at a cost of Tk 1.746 billion Bangladeshi taka (equivalent to $20.8 million in 2018).

References

Educational institutions established in 2018
2018 establishments in Bangladesh
Textile schools in Bangladesh
Education in Rangpur, Bangladesh
Universities and colleges in Rangpur District
Colleges affiliated to Bangladesh University of Textiles